Salute for Three is a 1943 American comedy musical film starring Macdonald Carey and Betty Jane Rhodes.

Plot

The singer Judy Ames's agent thinks she might get some favorable and helpful publicity if he can arrange for her to appear to be in a new romance with Buzz McAlister, a war hero.

Cast
 Betty Jane Rhodes as Judy
 Macdonald Carey as Buzz
 Marty May as Jimmy Gates
 Dona Drake as herself
 Noel Neill as Gracie O'Connor
 Cliff Edwards as Foggy

Production
Jules Styne wrote some of the music.

References

External links
Salute for Three at IMDb
Salute for Three at BFI

1943 films
1943 musical films
American musical films
American black-and-white films
Films directed by Ralph Murphy
1940s American films
1940s English-language films
Paramount Pictures films